Wynyard Battye (9 January 1838 – 10 February 1882) was an English first-class cricketer and British Indian Army officer.

The son of George Wynyard Battye-Cumming and Marion Martha Money, he was born in January 1838 at Berhampur in British India. Through his mothers side, it is a possibility that he was the illegitimate grandson of Princess Elizabeth of the United Kingdom, making George III his great-grandfather. Battye served in the British Indian Army during the Indian Rebellion of 1857, holding a commission with the 65th Bengal Native Infantry. He came to England following the suppression of the mutiny, where he played a first-class cricket match for the Marylebone Cricket Club (MCC) against Kent at Maidstone in June 1859. Batting twice in the match, he was dismissed for 2 runs in the MCC first innings by George Wigzell, while in their second innings he was dismissed without scoring by Edgar Willsher. Returning to British India, he was promoted to lieutenant in November 1864, before being promoted to captain in April 1866. He was promoted to major in April 1874 and served in the Second Anglo-Afghan War from 1878 to 1880. Battye died in England at Weybridge in February 1882.

References

External links

1838 births
1882 deaths
People from Ganjam district
British Indian Army officers
British people in colonial India
British military personnel of the Indian Rebellion of 1857
English cricketers
Marylebone Cricket Club cricketers
British military personnel of the Second Anglo-Afghan War